Joyce Nicholson  (née Thorpe) (1 June 1919 – 30 January 2011) was an Australian author and business woman.

The daughter of publisher D.W. Thorpe, Nicholson was born in Melbourne and educated at Methodist Ladies' College and the University of Melbourne. She was active in the Sisters Publishing. She was  managing director, and later sole owner, of D.W. Thorpe Pty Ltd, from 1968 until 1987, when the firm was sold. She authored over 25 books, many of them dealing with children and women. In 1983, Nicholson was made a Member of the Order of Australia (AM) for "service to literature and the book publishing industry". She married Harvey Nicholson and had four children: Peter, Hilary, Wendy, and Michael.

Nicholson sponsored the Joyce Thorpe Nicholson Collection, a collection of books by and about Australian women at Melbourne University. It includes rare nineteenth-century material as well as scarce twentieth-century political ephemera. The Joyce Thorpe Nicholson Hall of Fame Award is sponsored by Thorpe Bowker and presented periodically to a designer whose body of work has made a significant contribution to the standards of book design in Australia.

Timeline
(Details from an online biography)
 1935–1946: junior typist, secretary and sub-editor at D W Thorpe Pty Ltd (Melbourne)
 1940: vice-president of the Student Representative Council at the University of Melbourne
 1943: married George Harvey Nicholson (dec.1980). They had four children
 1947–1968: writer and part-time work at D W Thorpe Pty Ltd (Melbourne)
 1957: organizer of the first Children's Book Week in Victoria
 1968–1980: managing director and proprietor of D W Thorpe Pty Ltd (Melbourne), and editor, Australian Bookseller and Australian Books in Print
 1971–1974: editor of the newsletter of the Royal Historical Society of Victoria
 1972–1983: secretary and executive member of the Australian Library Promotion Council
 1974: founding member of the National Book Council
 1979–1980: co-founder and director of Sisters Publishing Ltd
 1987–1992: chief executive officer of Jayen Press
 1993: chief executive officer of Courtyard Press
 1998: recipient of the Lloyd O'Neil Award for services to the Book Industry

Books
 Nicholson, Joyce, How to play auction bridge, G.W. Green & Sons, [Melbourne], [193-], 23 pp.
 Nicholson, Joyce, How to play solo : complete guide to solo (solo whist), auction solo, three-handed solo, hints on bidding and play, scoring, illustrated hands, with special chapter for beginners who have never played cards of any kind, Gordon and Gotch (Wholesale distributors), Melbourne, [1945?], 64 pp.
 Nicholson, Joyce, The Way to Play – a book on strategies to win at the card Game Solo
 Nicholson, Joyce, You can run a library, Australian Red Cross Society, [Melbourne?], 1948, 56 pp.
 Nicholson, Joyce, Our first overlander, Shakespeare Head Press, Sydney, 1956, 128 pp.
 Nicholson, Joyce, The Children's Party and Games Book, 1957 – Over 100 different games from the 1950s. Epworth Press
 Nicholson, Joyce, Kerri and Honey, Lansdowne, Melbourne, 1962, 32 pp.
 Nicholson, Joyce, A mortar-board for Priscilla, Children's Library Guild of Australia, Melbourne, 1963, 121 pp.
 Nicholson, Joyce, Freedom for Priscilla, Thomas Nelson, Melbourne, 1974, 121 pp.
 Nicholson, Joyce, Cranky – The baby Australian Camel, Lansdowne press, [Melbourne], 1983
 Nicholson, Joyce, Why women lose at bridge, V. Gollancz in association with P. Crawley, London, 1985, 95 pp.
 Nicholson, Joyce, Man against mutiny : the story of Vice-Admiral Bligh, Lutterworth Press, London, c1961, 95 pp.
 Nicholson, Joyce, (compiled by ), Successful parties and social evenings, Gordon and Gotch [Distributor], Melbourne, [195-?], 64 pp.
 Nicholson, Joyce, and De Lisle, Gordon (photography by), Ringtail the possum, Lansdowne, [Melbourne], 1965, 32 pp.
 Nicholson, Joyce, & Leunig, Mary, 1950– (illustrated by), What society does to girls, Pitman (Australia), Carlton, Vic., 1975, 70 pp.
 Nicholson, Joyce, & Max B. Miller (illustrations by), The little green tractor, Little Books Publishing House, Hawthorn,Vic, [1950]
 Nicholson, Joyce, & Max B. Miller (illustrations by), The little blue car, Little Books Publishing House, Hawthorn,Vic, [19??]
 Nicholson, Joyce, & McArdle, Brian (photography by), Sir Charles and the lyrebird, Lansdowne, Melbourne, 1966
 Nicholson, Joyce, & Smith, L. H. (Leonard Hart), 1910– (photography by ), Woop the wombat, Lansdowne, [Melbourne], [1968], 32 pp.
 Nicholson, Joyce, & Smith, L. H. (Leonard Hart), 1910–, illus., Yap the penguin, Lansdowne, [Melbourne], 1967, 32 pp.
 Nicholson, Joyce, & Thorpe, Daniel (Daniel Wrixon), 1889–1976., A life of books : the story of D.W. Thorpe Pty Ltd., 1921–1987, Courtyard Press, Middle Park, Vic., 2000, 326 pp.  The story of DW Thorpe Publishers (Publishers of Australian Bookseller & Publisher).  A Life of books is a chronicle not only of a family company that has been at the centre of the book trade in Australia since the 1920s, but equally, of the people, companies, associations, issues, debates, troubles and joys that have affected the industry.
 Nicholson, Joyce, The Heartache of Motherhood, 1983 From the mother of 4 grown-up children. After 35 years of devoted marriage, she left the family home to live alone – happily. This book is a deeply personal account of her feelings about being a mother; her honesty is extraordinary and very moving, her conclusions startling.
 Nicholson, Joyce, Daughter to Bligh, 2012 www.digbys.com – The story of Mary Bligh, daughter of William Bligh.

Journal articles
 Gorman, Lyn, A life in books, Australian Library Journal, vol. 49, no. 4, 2000, pp. 374–376.
 First Pacific Book Trade Seminar Papers, D. W. Thorpe (January 1976)

Thesis
 Nicholson, Joyce, The Women's Electoral Lobby and Women's Employment: Strategies and Outcomes, MA, Women's Studies, History, The University of Melbourne', MA thesis, The University of Melbourne, 1991, 118 pp.

References

External links
 Joyce Nicholson, Australian Women – Biographical Entry
 Thorpe, Daniel Wrixon (1889–1976) – Australian Dictionary of Biography
 Impressive, generous achiever – Obituary by Beatrice Faust published in The Age Newspaper Melbourne on 11 February 2011
 Australian Bookseller & Publisher
 Joyce Thorpe Nicholson Australian Women Collection
 De Micheli, Catherine and Herd, Margaret (eds), Who's who in Australia 2003, 39 edn, Crown Content, North Melbourne, 2003, 2201 pp.
 Lofthouse, Andrea (ed.), Who's who of Australian women, Methuen Australia, North Ryde (NSW), 1982, 504 pp. – Based on the research by Vivienne Smith (died 1978) who initiated the work in 1974. Following Smith's death a committee of women was brought together by Joyce Nicholson to see the idea thriugh to completion. Andrea Lofthouse was the committee's nominee to compile Smith's material and to build on it. – Bookjacket.
 Walker, Nick, A life of books : the story of D.W. Thorpe Pty Ltd., 1921–1987, Victorian Historical Journal, vol. 71, no. 2, 2000, pp. 129–131.
 Patricia Grimshaw & Lynne Strahan (Eds.), The Half-Open Door: Sixteen Modern Australian women look at professional life and achievement: Ch.7 Joyce Nicholson, Hale & Iremonger, 1982

Australian historians
Australian feminist writers
Australian children's writers
1919 births
2011 deaths
Australian women in business
People educated at Methodist Ladies' College, Melbourne
University of Melbourne alumni
Australian women historians
Australian women children's writers
Members of the Order of Australia